Oncopera intricoides is a moth of the family Hepialidae. It is endemic to Victoria.

References

Moths described in 1933
Hepialidae